KS 7 may refer to:
Kansas's 7th congressional district
K-7 (Kansas highway)